Minister for Sport and Recreation is a position in the government of Western Australia, currently   Dr Tony Buti  held by of the Labor Party. The position was first created in 1972, in the ministry of John Tonkin, and has existed in every government since then. The minister is responsible for the Department of Sport and Recreation.

Titles
 6 July 1972 – 20 December 1984: Minister for Recreation
 20 December 1984 – present: Minister for Sport and Recreation

List of ministers

See also
 Minister for Racing and Gaming (Western Australia)
 Minister for Tourism (Western Australia)

References

 David Black (2014), The Western Australian Parliamentary Handbook (Twenty-Third Edition). Perth [W.A.]: Parliament of Western Australia.

Sport
Minister for Sport
Sport in Western Australia